Sandro Todua (born 2 November 1987 in Tbilisi, Georgia) is a Georgian rugby union player. He plays at wing (and occasionally centre) for the Rugby Pro D2 side SC Albi and for the Georgia national team.

References 

1987 births
Rugby union players from Georgia (country)
Living people
Rugby union players from Tbilisi
Expatriate rugby union players from Georgia (country)
Expatriate rugby union players in France
Expatriate sportspeople from Georgia (country) in France
Georgia international rugby union players
Batumi RC players
SC Albi players
The Black Lion players
Rugby union fullbacks